is a Welsh-language news website. It aims to provide a rolling news service from Wales and elsewhere, as well as sport and cultural news.

The website was launched in 2009 with funding from the Welsh Government. The website received 14,537 individual daily visits and 160,361 page visits during 2018–19. During 2019–20, the average daily figure for individual daily visits increased to 16,185; page visits decreased to 147,758.

References

External links
 

Welsh-language mass media
Welsh websites
Internet properties established in 2009